Ramanagara is a city in the Indian state of Karnataka. It is also the headquarters of Ramanagara district. It is approximately 50 kilometres from Bangalore. There are buses and trains as public transportations which approximately takes 90 minutes from Bangalore. 

Famous Bollywood movie Sholay was shot in 1975 at the surrounding hills of Ramanagara now called Ramagiri hills but also has nickname of Sholay hills.

The town was known as Shamserabad at the ruling time of Tippu Sultan. It was called Closepet, after Sir Barry Close (1756–1813) in pre-independence times. This name is retained in geology. Then Closepet was called Ramanagara. Ramanagara's name was based on the historical story of the Ramayana.

Demographics 
 India census, Ramanagara had a population of 79,365. Males constitute 52% of the population and females 48%. Ramanagara has an average literacy rate of 63%, higher than the national average of 59.5%: male literacy is 67%, and female literacy is 58%. In Ramanagara, 13% of the population is under 6 years of age.

Figures for the district, which was carved out of Bangalore Rural in September 2007, are not available as yet. Now it is changed to Ramanagara district.

Economy 

Ramanagara is well known for its sericulture, and is nicknamed Silk Town and Silk City . The silk produced in this region forms the input for the famous Mysore Silk. Ramanagara is the largest market for silk cocoons in Asia. 50 tonnes of cocoon a day arrive at the town. Ramanagar has extensive granite sites.

Closepet granites 

The Closepet granites are a major geological feature of this region and are from the Lower Proterozoic era. This belt of rocks extends in the north-south direction in 50 km belt. This belt has younger potassic granites and is believed to separate two distinct crustal blocks of Archaean age. The block to the west has low-grade granite-greenstone belts with iron-manganese ores and to the east are younger gneisses of granitic and granodioritic composition with gold-bearing schist belts.

See also 
 Climbing locations in India

References

External links 

 Bangalore rural district - taluk page

 Ramanagara Ramdevara Betta Trek

Climbing areas of India